The Ryan White Comprehensive AIDS Resources Emergency Act (Ryan White CARE Act)), was an act of the United States Congress and  is the largest federally funded program in the United States for people living with HIV/AIDS. In exchange for States adopting harsh criminal laws regulating the conduct of HIV-positive individuals  and providing for their public felony prosecution, the act made federal funding available through contingency grants to states for low-income, uninsured, and under-insured people to be treated with the chemotherapeutic drug AZT. The act is named in honor of Ryan White, an Indiana teenager who contracted AIDS through a tainted blood transfusion. He was diagnosed with AIDS in 1984 at age 13 and was subsequently expelled from school because of the disease. White became a well-known advocate for AIDS research and awareness until his death in 1990 at age 18.

Ryan White programs are "payer of last resort" which fund treatment when no other resources are available.  As AIDS has spread, the funding of the program has increased.  In 1991, the first year funds were appropriated, around US$220 million were spent; by the early 2000s, this number had almost increased 10-fold. The Act was reauthorized in 1996, 2000, 2006, and 2009.  The program provides some level of care for around 500,000 people a year and, in 2004, provided funds to 2,567 organizations.  The Ryan White programs also fund local and state primary medical care providers, support services, healthcare provider training programs, and provide technical assistance to such organizations.

In fiscal year 2005, federal funding for the Ryan White CARE Act was $2.1 billion.  As of 2005, roughly one-third of this money went to the AIDS Drug Assistance Programs (ADAP) which provides drugs for 30 percent of people living with HIV.  The primary activity of ADAP is providing FDA-approved prescription medication.

The Ryan White CARE Act mandates that EMS personnel can find out whether they were exposed to life-threatening diseases while providing care.  (This notification provision was included in the original 1990 act, dropped in the 2006 reauthorization, and reinstated in the 2008 reauthorization).

2006 reauthorization

The Ryan White Care Act was due to be reauthorized at the end of 2005, but Congress could not reach agreement on changes, and the act was extended for one year under the old terms.

In 2006, the act was reauthorized for three more years, ending on September 30, 2009 with a funding level of $2.1 billion.

Prior to the reauthorization, the act allocated money based on the proportion of patients with AIDS in each region.  The 2006 reauthorization changed this allocation mechanism to also consider the number of people living with HIV who do not have a clinical diagnosis of AIDS 

A significant portion of funding from the act is emergency relief for Eligible Metropolitan Areas.  The 2006 reauthorization redefined EMAs as cities with a population greater than 50,000, instead of previous versions which required 500,000.

2009 reauthorization

In 2009, Congress passed the Ryan White HIV/AIDS Treatment Extension Act, which was signed by President Obama on October 30, 2009. This bill extends the Ryan White Care Act for an additional four years.

2013 expiration
In 2013, the Ryan White CARE Act expired; however the Program remains as Congress continues to appropriate funding.

Special Projects of National Significance
The Special Projects of National Significance (often abbreviated to SPNS) program is a United States Department of Health program that helps to "advance knowledge and skills in the health and support services to underserved populations diagnosed with HIV infection." The current SPNS effort began in 1991 with several federal grants; portfolio of 72 grants currently address issues in HIV care.

References

External links

 The Ryan White HIV/AIDS Program
 Special projects of national significance

HIV/AIDS in the United States
United States Department of Health and Human Services
United States federal health legislation